The episodes of children's television series Raa Raa the Noisy Lion, aired from 2011 to 2017.

Series overview

Episodes

Series 1 (2011)

Series 2 (2012)

Series 3 (2017)

References 

Lists of American children's television series episodes
Lists of British children's television series episodes